Terry M. Smith (born July 29, 1969) is an American college football coach and former player.  He played college football at Penn State and is currently the associate head coach, defensive recruiting coordinator and Cornerbacks coach for his college alma mater.

Early life
Originally from Aliquippa, Pa, Smith and his family moved to Monroeville, Pa where he was a star quarterback for the Gateway Gators.  Smith led the Gators to back-to-back WPIAL football titles in 1985 and 1986.  Considered one of the greatest WPIAL championships ever played, the 1986 game featured an undefeated Gateway team and a North Hills team that was ranked No. 1 by USA Today.  Smith scored Gateways only touchdown as they defeated North Hills 7–6.

College playing career
Nicknamed Superfly, Smith, was a four-year letter winner from 1988–91 with the Nittany Lions who still ranks among the schools’ best with 108 career receptions and 15 receiving touchdowns.  During the 1991 season, posting a 40-yard dash time of 4.4 seconds, Smith came up big against USC, grabbing 10 receptions to tie a Penn State single-game mark and gaining 165 yards to set a new school record. His Senior season, Smith broke school records with 55 catches for 846 yards and eight scores, helping Penn State to an 11–2 record and a Fiesta Bowl victory over Tennessee.  After breaking the single season receptions record in a game against Rutgers, Joe Paterno said about Smith, "I don't know whether there's a better wideout in the country as far as what he does. He catches the ball, he blocks, he runs with the ball, he's in the football game -- he's just a great player."

Professional playing career
Drafted by the Washington Redskins in the 11th round of the 1992 NFL draft , Smith spent the following three seasons with the Toronto Argonauts and the Shreveport Pirates of the Canadian Football League.  Smith also spent one season with the Albany Firebirds of the Arena league in 1996.

Coaching career

Early coaching career
In 1996, Smith began his coaching career as an assistant at Hempfield High School.  From there Smith spent the next four seasons as the passing coordinator for the Duquesne Dukes.  In 2001, Smith returned to his high school alma mater the Gateway Gators where he served as the offensive coordinator.

The following season Smith was named as the Gators Head Coach and over the next eleven seasons Smith led Gateway to a 101-30 mark and four WPIAL runner-up finishes.  In that time Smith sent 23 players to NCAA FBS (I-A) colleges and 17 more to FCS(I-AA) colleges. Smith, who also served as the athletic director, departed Gateway following the 2012 football season when his athletic director position was reduced to part-time. His salary was also cut in half and the district instituted a new rule that no administrator could coach. Following a January recruiting visit in 2013, the Temple Owls coach and fellow Penn State alum Matt Rhule offered Smith a coaching position as his wide receivers coach.

Penn State
In 2014, James Franklin hired Smith as the Penn State Nittany Lions’ defensive recruiting coordinator and cornerbacks coach, positions he currently maintains.  During his first season with the Nittany Lions, the defense finished second in total defense, eighth in scoring, second in pass efficiency and sixth in 3rd down conversion percentage nationally.

Smith added the title of assistant head coach following the season.

Lead by sophomore John Reid, who earned All-Big Ten honorable mention accolades, and Grant Haley, the cornerbacks made several key plays to help the Nittany Lions to the 2016 Big Ten Football Championship Game.

In 2017 Smith's starting cornerbacks, Christian Campbell and Grant Haley, earned All-Big Ten honorable mention accolades, while backup cornerback Amani Oruwariye earned second team honors. That season the Nittany Lions' defense helped Penn State to its second-straight New Year's Six bowl and a Top 10 finish.  Also the 16.5 points allowed per game was the fewest since the 2008 team gave up 12.2 per contest.  Campbell was drafted by the Arizona Cardinals in the sixth round (182nd overall) of the 2018 NFL Draft.

In 2018, cornerbacks Amani Oruwariye earned first team All-Big Ten honors, while John Reid received honorable mention.  Penn State secondary had one of its best seasons since 2014, finishing the season with 13 interceptions and allowing a 53.6 completion rate.  The Nittany Lions also held three opponents to 60 or less yards through the air, this was the first time PSU had accomplished this feat since the 1976 season.

In 2019, cornerback Tariq Castro-Fields earned third team All-Big Ten honors. During the 2020 season, Smith was made the lead recruiter for the Philadelphia area. In 2021, Penn State signed its first players from the Philadelphia Public League to a recruiting class since 2016 and the first Philadelphia Catholic League player since 2017.

Personal
Smith received a Bachelors in business management, from the Pennsylvania State University.  He and his wife, Alison, have a son, former PSU standout Justin King , and daughter, Haley.  Smith, is a class of 2018 WPIAL Hall of Fame inductee.

External links
Penn State Profile
Temple Profile
Gateway Profile

References

Living people
1969 births
Players of American football from Pennsylvania
People from Monroeville, Pennsylvania
American football wide receivers
Temple Owls football coaches
Penn State Nittany Lions football players
Penn State Nittany Lions football coaches
African-American coaches of American football
African-American players of American football
Shreveport Pirates players
Albany Firebirds players
Canadian football wide receivers
21st-century African-American people
20th-century African-American sportspeople